Warren Elvin Wilson was an American professor of civil engineering and college administrator. He was educated at Lehigh University with a B.S. in 1928, followed by Cornell University with an M.C.E. in 1932, California Institute of Technology with an M.S. in 1939. He received his Ph.D. from the University of Iowa in 1941. He served as president of South Dakota School of Mines and Technology from 1948 to 1953.

References

Lehigh University alumni
Cornell University College of Engineering alumni
California Institute of Technology alumni
University of Iowa alumni
South Dakota School of Mines and Technology faculty
Heads of universities and colleges in the United States
Year of birth missing
Year of death missing